Allegations that the United States military used biological weapons in the Korean War (June 1950 – July 1953) were raised by the governments of People's Republic of China, the Soviet Union, and North Korea. The claims were first raised in 1951. The story was covered by the worldwide press and led to a highly publicized international investigation in 1952. Secretary of State Dean Acheson and other American and allied government officials denounced the allegations as a hoax. Subsequent scholars are split about the truth of the claims.

Background 
Until the end of World War II, Japan operated a covert biological and chemical warfare research and development unit called Unit 731 in Harbin (now China). The unit's activities, including human experimentation, were documented by the Khabarovsk War Crime Trials conducted by the Soviet Union in December 1949. However, at that time, the US government described the Khabarovsk trials as "vicious and unfounded propaganda". It was later revealed that the accusations made against the Japanese military were correct. The US government had taken over the research at the end of the war and had then covered up the program. Leaders of Unit 731 were exempted from war crimes prosecution by the United States and then placed on the payroll of the US.

On 30 June 1950, soon after the outbreak of the Korean War, the US Defense Secretary George Marshall received the Report of the Committee on Chemical, Biological and Radiological Warfare and Recommendations, which advocated urgent development of a biological weapons program. The biological weapons research facility at Fort Detrick, Maryland was expanded, and a new one in Pine Bluff, Arkansas, was developed.

Allegations 
During 1951, as the war turned against the United States, the Chinese and North Koreans made vague allegations of biological warfare, but these were not pursued. General Matthew Ridgway, United Nations Commander in Korea, denounced the initial charges as early as May 1951.  He accused the communists of spreading "deliberate lies".  A few days later, Vice Admiral Charles Turner Joy repeated the denials.

On 28 January 1952, the Chinese People's Volunteer Army headquarters received a report of a smallpox outbreak southeast of Incheon. From February to March 1952, more bulletins reported disease outbreaks in the area of Chorwon, Pyongyang, Kimhwa and even Manchuria. The Chinese soon became concerned when 13 Korean and 16 Chinese soldiers contracted cholera and the plague, while another 44 recently deceased were tested positive for meningitis.  Although the Chinese and the North Koreans did not know exactly how the soldiers contracted the diseases, the suspicions soon fell on the Americans.

On 22 February 1952, North Korean Foreign Minister Pak Hon-yong made a formal allegation that American planes had been dropping infected insects onto North Korea. He added that the Americans were "openly collaborating with the Japanese bacteriological war criminals, the former jackals of the Japanese militarists whose crimes are attested to by irrefutable evidence. Among the Japanese war criminals sent to Korea were Shiro Ishii, Jiro Wakamatsu and Masajo Kitano."  Pak's accusations were immediately denied by the US government. The accusation was supported by eye-witness accounts by Australian reporter Wilfred Burchett and others.

In June 1952 the United States proposed to the United Nations Security Council that the Council request the International Red Cross investigate the allegations. The Soviet Union vetoed the American resolution due to extensive US influence inside the Red Cross, and, along with its allies, continued to insist on the veracity of the biological warfare accusations.

In February 1953, China and North Korea produced two captured US Marine Corps pilots to support the allegations.  Colonel Frank Schwable was reported to have stated that: "The basic objective was at that time to get under field conditions various elements of bacteriological warfare and possibly expand field tests at a later date into an element of regular combat operations."  Schwable's statement said that B-29s flew biological warfare missions to Korea from airfields in American-occupied Okinawa starting in November 1951. Schwable's statement was obtained following months of torture and abuse at the hands of his captors, according to the US military. Other captured Americans such as Colonel Walker "Bud" Mahurin made similar statements.

Upon release the prisoners of war repudiated their confessions which they said had been extracted by torture. However, the retractions happened in front of military cameras after the United States government threatened to charge the POWs with treason for cooperating with their captors. When Kenneth Enoch, one of the former POWs who retracted his confession, was tracked down in 2010 by Al Jazeera reporters he denied being ill-treated or indoctrinated by the North Korean or Chinese guards.

International Scientific Commission 

When the International Red Cross and the World Health Organization ruled out biological warfare, the Chinese government denounced them as being biased by the influence of US, and arranged an investigation by the Soviet-affiliated World Peace Council. The World Peace Council set up the "International Scientific Commission for the Facts Concerning Bacterial Warfare in China and Korea" (ISC). This commission had several distinguished scientists and doctors from France, Italy, Sweden, Brazil and Soviet Union, including renowned British biochemist and sinologist Joseph Needham. The commission's findings included dozens of eyewitnesses, testimonies from doctors, medical samples from the deceased, bomb casings as well as four American Korean War prisoners who confirmed the US use of biological warfare. On 15 September 1952, the final report was signed, stating that the US was experimenting with biological weapons in Korea.

The report suggested a link to the World War II Japanese germ warfare Unit 731. Former Unit 731 members Shirō Ishii, Masaji Kitano, and Ryoichi Naito, and other Japanese biological warfare experts were often named in the allegations.  Former members of Unit 731 were linked initially, by a Communist news agency, to a freighter that allegedly carried them and all equipment necessary to mount a biological warfare campaign to Korea in 1951. The commission placed credence on allegations that Ishii made two visits to South Korea in early 1952, and another one in March 1953. The official consensus in China was that biological weapons created from an American-Japanese collaboration were used in the Korean episode. Citing the claims Ishii had visited South Korea, the report stated: "Whether occupation authorities in Japan had fostered his activities, and whether the American Far Eastern Command was engaged in making use of methods essentially Japanese, were questions which could hardly have been absent from the minds of members of the Commission."

The International Association of Democratic Lawyers (IADL) publicized these claims in its 1952 "Report on U.S. Crimes in Korea", as did US journalist John W. Powell.

The Sams mission 
The Communists also alleged that US Brigadier General Crawford Sams had carried out a secret mission behind their lines at Wonsan in March 1951, testing biological weapons. The US government said that he had actually been investigating a reported outbreak of bubonic plague in North Korea, but had determined it was hemorrhagic smallpox. Sams' mission had been launched from the US Navy's LCI(L)-1091, which had been converted to a laboratory ship in 1951. During its time in Korea, the ship was assigned as an epidemiological control ship for Fleet Epidemic Disease Control Unit No. 1, a part of the US effort to combat malaria in Korea. After covert missions in North Korea, from October to September 1951, LSIL-1091 was at Koje-do testing residents and refugees for malaria.

Some authors have emphasized Sams' relationship with biological warfare actors, which both China and North Korea found suspicious. According to Japanese historian, Takemae Eiji, Sams had a relationship with the former members of Imperial Japan's biological warfare department, Unit 731. Appointed by General MacArthur as the head of the post-war Occupation government's Public Health & Welfare Section, Sams was instrumental in founding Japan's National Institute of Health, whose first deputy director, Kojima Saburō, was an Ishii associate. Saburō then recruited other former former Unit 731 personnel for the new Institute. According to Eiji, "Sams and others in PH&W not only knew of these men's sordid pasts but actively solicited their cooperation to further PH&W goals....  Sams and his staff became, in effect, co-conspirators after the fact in those wartime crimes".

Counterclaims 
The US and its allies responded by describing the allegations as a hoax. The US government declared the IADL to be a Communist front organization since 1950, and charged Powell with sedition. In a highly publicized 1959 trial, Powell was indicted on 13 counts of sedition for reporting on the allegations, while two of his editors were indicted on one count of sedition each. All charges were dropped after the trial ended in mistrial after five years. However, Powell was then blacklisted and thereafter unable to secure work as a journalist for the rest of his life.

According to news reports during the trial, the U.S. Attorney in the case, James B. Schnake, submitted an affidavit in which he stated the U.S. government was prepared to stipulate "that during the period Jan. 1, 1949, through July 27, 1953, the United States Army had a capability to wage both chemical and biological warfare offensively and defensively.... Responsible officials in the Department of Defense have determined the revelations of detailed records on this subject would be highly detrimental to the national security."

American authorities long denied the charges of postwar Japanese-United States cooperation in biological warfare developments, despite later incontrovertible proof that the US pardoned Unit 731 in exchange for their research, according to Sheldon H. Harris. But in December 1998, in a letter from Department of Justice official Eli Rosenbaum to Rabbi Abraham Cooper of the Simon Wiesenthal Center, a U.S. government official admitted that the U.S. had made an amnesty agreement with Shiro Ishii and personnel from Unit 731, despite known crimes committed by Ishii and associates concerning illegal human experimentation. The letter wasn't made public until published by Jeffrey Kaye in May 2017.

Australian journalist, Denis Warner, suggested that the story was concocted by Wilfred Burchett as part of his alleged role as a KGB agent of influence.  Warner pointed out the similarity of the allegations to a science fiction story by Jack London, a favorite author of Burchett's. However, the notion that Burchett originated the "hoax" has been decisively refuted by one of his most trenchant critics, Tibor Méray. Méray worked as a correspondent for the Hungarian People's Republic during the war but fled the country after the abortive Hungarian Revolution of 1956.  Now a staunch anti-Communist, he has confirmed that he saw clusters of flies crawling on ice. Méray has argued the evidence was the result of an elaborate conspiracy:  "Now somehow or other these flies must have been brought there ... the work must have been carried out by a large network covering the whole of North Korea."

Disease prevention measures 

Recent research has indicated that, regardless of the accuracy of the allegations, the Chinese acted as if they were true. After learning of the outbreaks, Mao Zedong immediately requested Soviet assistance on disease preventions, while the Chinese People's Liberation Army General Logistics Department was mobilized for anti-bacteriological warfare. On the Korean battlefield, four anti-bacteriological warfare research centers were soon set up, while about 5.8 million doses of vaccine and 200,000 gas masks were delivered to the front. Within China, 66 quarantine stations were also set up along the Chinese borders, while about 5 million Chinese in Manchuria were inoculated. The Chinese government also initiated the "Patriotic Health and Epidemic Prevention Campaign" and directed every citizen to kill flies, mosquitoes and fleas. These disease prevention measures soon resulted in an improvement of health for Communist soldiers on the Korean battlefield. Tibor Méray provided eyewitness account of North Korea conducting an "unprecedented campaign of public health" during the allegation.

Subsequent evaluation 
Some historians have offered other explanations to the disease outbreaks during the spring of 1952. For example, it has been noted that spring time is usually a period of epidemics within China and North Korea, and years of warfare had also caused a breakdown in the Korean health care system. US military historians have argued that under these circumstances, diseases could easily spread throughout the entire military and civilian populations within Korea.

In 1986, Australian historian Gavan McCormack argued that the claim of US biological warfare use was "far from inherently implausible", pointing out that one of the POWs who confessed, Walker Mahurin, was in fact associated with Fort Detrick. He also pointed out that, as the deployment of nuclear and chemical weapons was considered, there is no reason to believe that ethical principles would have overruled the resort to biological warfare. He also suggested that the outbreak in 1951 of viral haemorrhagic fever, which had previously been unknown in Korea, was linked to biological warfare. However, by 2004, McCormack had changed his mind. In a book about North Korea, he wrote that the alleged Soviet archival documents published by Kathryn Weathersby and Milton Leitenberg in 1998 (see discussion in section on "Endicott and Hagerman" below) had  “provided a fragmentary, but persuasive, explanation of what had actually happened” in relation to the germ warfare charges. According to McCormack, “Analysis of these documents makes it seem almost certain that there was a vigorous, complex, contrived, and fraudulent international campaign on the part of the North Koreans, the Chinese, and the Russians — a gigantic fraud….”

In a 1988 book Korea: The Unknown War, historians Jon Halliday and Bruce Cumings also suggested the claims might be true. They questioned whether the North Koreans and the Chinese could have "mounted a spectacular piece of fraudulent theater, involving the mobilization of thousands", getting scores of Chinese doctors, scientists, and senior officials "to fake evidence, lie and invent medical fraud", allocating much of their already stretched logistical resource to defend against biological warfare, all for a propaganda campaign against US.

In 1989, a British study of Unit 731 strongly supported the theory of United States–Japanese biological warfare culpability in Korea.

In 1995, using available Chinese documents, historian Shu Guang Zhang of the University of Maryland stated that there is little, if any information that currently exists on the Chinese side which explains how the Chinese scientists came up with the conclusion of US biological warfare during the disease outbreak in the spring of 1952. Zhang further theorized that the allegation was caused by unfounded rumors and scientific investigations on the allegation was purposely ignored on the Chinese side for the sake of domestic and international propaganda.

Published in Japan in 2001, the book Rikugun Noborito Kenkyujo no shinjitsu or The Truth About the Army Noborito Institute stated that members of Japan's Unit 731 also worked for the "chemical section" of a US clandestine unit hidden within Yokosuka Naval Base during the Korean War as well as on projects inside the United States from 1955 to 1959.

According to Jeffrey Kaye's interpretation of a "Memorandum of Conversation" from the Psychological Strategy Board (PSB) dated 6 July 1953 (and declassified and released by the CIA in 2006), the US protestations at the United Nations did not mean the US was serious about conducting any investigation into biological warfare charges, despite what the government said publicly. The reason the US didn't want any investigation was because an "actual investigation" would reveal military operations, "which, if revealed, could do us psychological as well as military damage". The memorandum, which had been sent to CIA director Allen Dulles, specifically stated as an example of what could be revealed "Eighth Army preparations or operations (e.g. chemical warfare)."

Investigative journalist Simon Winchester concluded in 2008 that Soviet intelligence was sceptical of the allegation, but that North Korea leader Kim Il Sung believed it.  Winchester said the question "has still not been satisfactorily answered".

Entomologist Jeffrey A. Lockwood wrote in 2009 that the biological warfare program at Ft. Detrick began to research the use of insects as disease vectors going back to World War II and also employed German and Japanese scientists after the war who had experimented on human subjects among POWs and concentration camp inmates. Scientists used or attempted to use a wide variety of insects in their biowar plans, including fleas, ticks, ants, lice and mosquitoes – especially mosquitoes that carried the yellow fever virus. They also tested these in the United States. Lockwood thinks that it is very likely that the US did use insects dropped from aircraft during the Korean War to spread diseases, and that the Chinese and North Koreans were not simply engaged in a propaganda campaign when they made these allegations, since the Joint Chiefs of Staff and Secretary of Defense had approved their use in the fall of 1950 at the "earliest practicable time".  At that time, it had five biowarfare agents ready for use, three of which were spread by insect vectors.

In March 2010, the allegations were investigated by the Al Jazeera English news program People & Power. In this program, Professor Mori Masataka investigated historical artifacts in the form of bomb casings from US biological weapons, contemporary documentary evidence and eyewitness testimonies. The program also uncovered a crucial document in the US National Archives which showed that in September 1951, the US Joint Chiefs of Staff issued orders to start "large scale field tests ... to determine the effectiveness of specific BW [bacteriological warfare] agents under operational conditions". Masataka concluded that: "Use of germ weapons in war is in breach of the Geneva Convention. I think that's why the Americans are refusing to admit the allegations. But I have no doubt. I'm absolutely sure that this happened.” The program concluded by noting that no conclusive evidence of the US's innocence or culpability has ever been presented.

Yanhuang Chunqiu, a liberal monthly journal in China, published an account in 2013 allegedly from Wu Zhili, the former surgeon general of Chinese People's Voluntary Army Logistic Department, which said that the bio warfare allegation was a false alarm, and that he had been forced to fabricate evidence. This account was published after the author's death in 2008. Its authenticity subsequently has been called into question by the Chinese Memorial of the War to Resist US Aggression and Aid Korea as unverifiable, because every single figure involved in the alleged private conversations and insider events from the account who could testify otherwise, had died before the date of publication. The museum also refuted the account's claim that "not one casualty resulted from events associated with biological warfare" as there are many clear records of such casualties, and claimed that it's implausible for a meager medical officer back then to have the technical knowledge to fool dozens of international medical experts signing the ISC report.

In 2019, the Pyongyang Times repeated the allegation, and said that the US government was continuing to develop biological warfare capabilities to use against North Korea.

Endicott and Hagerman
In 1998, Canadian researchers and historians Stephen L. Endicott and Edward Hagerman of York University made the case that the accusations were true in their book, The United States and Biological Warfare: Secrets from the Early Cold War and Korea. Shanghai-born Endicott, a Communist sympathizer, was the son of clergyman James Gareth Endicott, a prominent member of the Soviet-affiliated World Peace Council.

The book received mostly positive reviews, but with some negative criticism, with a US Military Academy professor calling the book an example of "bad history" and with another review in The New York Times calling the book's lack of direct evidence "appalling", although neither of these two negative reviews considers either the admissions that the US deployed chemical and biological weapons by Colonels Schwable and Mahurin, or the US chemical and biological weapons caches at locations such as Camp Detrick.

Many other reviews praised the research, with the director of East Asian studies at University of Pennsylvania saying "Endicott and Hagerman is far and away the most authoritative work on the subject", a review in Korean Quarterly calling it "a fascinating work of serious scholarship...presenting a compelling argument that the United States did, in fact, secretly experiment with biological weapons during the Korean War", and a review in The Nation calling it "the most impressive, expertly researched and, as far as the official files allow, the best-documented case for the prosecution yet made". A staff writer at state-owned China Daily noted that their book was the only one to have combined research across United States, Japan, Canada, Europe and China, as they were "the first foreigners to be given access to classified documents in the Chinese Central Archives".

In response, Kathryn Weathersby and Milton Leitenberg of the Cold War International History Project at the Woodrow Wilson Center released a cache of Soviet and Chinese documents in 1998 that they said revealed the allegations to have been an elaborate disinformation campaign. The handcopied documents are purportedly from Russian Presidential Archive, discovered by a Japanese reporter Yasuo Naito of Sankei Shimbun, a major conservative anti-communist Japanese national newspaper. Weathersby admitted that due to the way the documents are collected, there is no way to confirm their authenticity as seals, stamps or signature are missing, but due to their complexity and interwoven content, they are "extremely difficult to forge" and thus credible sources. They said that North Korea's health minister traveled in 1952 to the remote Manchurian city of Mukden where he procured a culture of plague bacilli which was used to infect condemned criminals as part of an elaborate disinformation scheme. Tissue samples were then used to fool the international investigators. The papers included telegrams and reports of meetings among Soviet and Chinese leaders, including Mao Zedong. A report to Lavrenti Beria, head of Soviet intelligence, for example, stated: "False plague regions were created, burials ... were organized, measures were taken to receive the plague and cholera bacillus." These documents revealed that only after Stalin's death the following year did the Soviet Union halt the disinformation campaign. Weathersby and Leitenberg consider their evidence to be conclusive—that the allegations were disinformation and no biological warfare use occurred. In 2001, anti-communist writer Herbert Romerstein supported Weathersby and Leitenberg's position while criticizing Endicott's research on the basis that it is based on accounts provided by the Chinese government.

In turn, Endicott and Hagerman responded to Weathersby and Leitenberg, noting that the documents are in fact handwritten copies and "the original source is not disclosed, the name of the collection is not identified, nor is there a volume number which would allow other scholars to locate and check the documents". They claimed that even if genuine the documents do not prove the United States did not use biological weapons, and they pointed out what they asserted to be various errors and inconsistencies in Weathersby and Leitenberg's analysis. According to Australian author and judge, Michael Pembroke, the documents associated with Beria (published by Weathersby and Leitenberg) were mostly created during the time of the power struggle after Stalin's death and are therefore questionable. In 2018, he concluded that: "It seems likely that the full story of the United States' involvement in biological warfare in Korea has not yet been told."

See also 

 2001 anthrax attacks - a rogue agent at Fort Detrick was the suspected perpetuator, according to FBI investigations
 Khabarovsk War Crime Trials
 Misinformation related to the COVID-19 pandemic
 Operation Big Buzz
 Operation Big Itch
 Operation Drop Kick
 Operation Sea-Spray - declassified US navy secret experiment in 1950 where supposedly harmless pathogens were sprayed over San Francisco in open-air tests of germ warfare.
 Project 112
 SARS conspiracy theory
 Unethical human experimentation in the United States
 United States biological weapons program
 Yellow rain

References

Further reading 

 Nicholson Baker, Baseless: My Search for Secrets in the Ruins of the Freedom of Information Act (Penguin Press, 2020) .
 Shiwei Chen, "History of Three Mobilizations: A Reexamination of the Chinese Biological Warfare Allegations against the United States in the Korean War," Journal of American-East Asian Relations 16.3  (2009):  213–247.
 John Clews, The Communists. New Weapon: Germ Warfare (London, 1952)
 Stephen L. Endicott, "Germ Warfare and "Plausible Denial": The Korean War, 1952–1953", Modern China 5.1  (January 1979):  79–104.
 Report of the International Scientific Commission for the Investigation of the Facts Concerning Bacterial Warfare in Korea and China (Peking and Prague, 1952);
 Stanley I. Kutler, The American Inquisition: Justice and Injustice in the Cold War (New York, 1982)
 Albert E. Cowdrey, "Germ Warfare and Public Health in the Korean Conflict", Journal of the History of Medicine and Allied Sciences 39 (1984)
 John Ellis van Courtland Moon, "Biological Warfare Allegations: The Korean War Case", Annals of the New York Academy of Sciences 666 (1992)
 Tom Buchanan, "The Courage of Galileo: Joseph Needham and the Germ Warfare Allegations in the Korean War", History 86 (October 2001)
 Julian Ryall, "Did the US wage germ warfare in Korea?", Telegraph,  (June 10, 2010).
 Ruth Rogaski, "Nature, Annihilation, and Modernity: China's Korean War Germ-Warfare Experience Reconsidered",  Journal of Asian Studies  61 (May 2002)
 Nianqun Yang, "Disease Prevention, Social Mobilization and Spatial Politics: The Anti Germ-Warfare Incident of 1952 and the Patriotic Health Campaign", Chinese Historical Review 11 (Fall 2004).

Korean War
Biological warfare
China–United States relations
North Korea–United States relations
Allegations
United States biological weapons program
Propaganda in the United States
Disinformation operations